Anshun Huangguoshu Airport  is a dual-use military and public airport serving the city of Anshun in Guizhou Province, China. It was built in 1965 as a military airport and opened to civil flights in 2002.

Airlines and destinations

See also
List of airports in China
List of the busiest airports in China
List of People's Liberation Army Air Force airbases

References

Airports in Guizhou
Chinese Air Force bases
Airports established in 1965
1965 establishments in China